Oeceoclades aurea is a terrestrial orchid species in the genus Oeceoclades that is endemic to Madagascar. It was first described by Xavier Garreau de Loubresse in a 1994 issue of the French orchid society journal Orchidée.

References

aurea
Endemic flora of Madagascar
Plants described in 1994